Gregory Spears is an American composer of instrumental and operatic works that blend aspects of romanticism, minimalism, and early music. Among his best known works are the operas Fellow Travelers and Paul's Case, as well as his Requiem.

Early life and education
Spears grew up in Virginia. He attended Eastman School of Music, received a master's degree at Yale University, and earned his Ph.D. at Princeton University. He studied with Hans Abrahamsen and Per Nørgård while a Fulbright Scholar at the Royal Danish Academy of Music.

Career 
His opera Fellow Travelers, adapted from the novel of the same name by Thomas Mallon with a libretto by Greg Pierce, premiered at Cincinnati Opera on June 17, 2016 and has since then been produced across the United States and has garnered many positive reviews. Anthony Tommasini in The New York Times wrote: "Originality in the arts is a vague and overhyped virtue. Few works are completely original. All creative artists borrow from others, both masters they revere and contemporaries they may be in competition with. Still, originality just comes through sometimes, as the composer Gregory Spears demonstrates in his personal, boldly quirky score for the wrenching, and sadly timely, opera “Fellow Travelers." And John von Rhein wrote in the Chicago Tribune: "Spears is unusually sensitive to the irregular cadences of American speech, and his setting of words to music is masterly... "Fellow Travelers" is one of the most accomplished new American operas I have encountered in recent years." Since its world premiere, it has received over 13 productions by companies such as Lyric Opera of Chicago, Prototype Festival, Minnesota Opera, Florida Grand Opera, Boston Lyric Opera, Des Moines Metro Opera, Virginia Opera, Arizona Opera, and more.

His latest opera Castor and Patience was commissioned for Cincinnati Opera's 100th anniversary season with an original libretto by Tracy K. Smith. The world premiere was delayed due to the COVID-19 pandemic from 2020 to July 2022. The opera received a Critic's Pick from The New York Times and was also named in The New York Times Best Classical Music Performances of 2022. Zachary Woolfe in his review for The New York Times describes the work: "The agonies and pleasures of “Castor and Patience,”... are like those of a less densely orchestrated Puccini. As in “Tosca,” “La Bohème” or “Madama Butterfly,” unabashedly, even shamelessly effusive vocal lines draw us poignantly close to characters in a rending situation: here, a Black family riven by disagreement over whether to sell part of a precious plot of land."

Gregory Spears and Tracy K. Smith's upcoming opera The Righteous is commissioned by Santa Fe Opera and will make its world premiere there in summer 2024.

He currently teaches composition at State University of New York at Purchase.

Style
Spears' music often draws on earlier musical styles processed through contemporary minimalist techniques.

The New York Timess Corinna da Fonseca-Wollheim described his opera Fellow Travelers: "But what makes Fellow Travelers such a satisfying operatic experience is the old-fashioned combination of a swift-flowing and deft libretto and gorgeous music." Alex Ross in The New Yorker elaborates: "The harmony is largely tonal, but it is anti-Romantic in effect, tending instead toward a decorous neo-Baroque sensibility. Voices and instruments often perform courtly pirouettes against sustained chords and even pulses. The atmosphere is one of hushed disclosure: the music implies more than it says. What emerges is a potently ambiguous sound world that conveys human warmth and chill in equal measure. Above all, it is a transparent medium in which singing actors can speak instead of shout."

Heidi Waleson described Spears' compositional style in her Wall Street Journal review of the opera O Columbia: "Mr. Spears writes brilliantly for vocal ensembles. Starting with neoclassical-style clarity, he builds textured, complex musical structures that sound old and new at the same time, and his skillful text settings use minimalist-like repetition to give Mr. Vavrek's pointed, thoughtful words even more power and emotional specificity."

Steve Smith, in his New York Times review of the opera Paul's Case, based on the Willa Cather short story of the same title, described the score: "Mr. Spears's elegantly spare music, with its gamelan-redolent modes and clockwork repetitions, Baroque vocal fillips, intricately woven ensembles and dramatically placed dissonances, further infuses the tale with a sense of ritual and inevitability."

David Patrick Stearns, in his Philadelphia Inquirer review of Spears' Requiem, described his musical influences: "Spears intersperses the swan myth with the requiem text, much of it reflecting lyrical Baltic influences of Arvo Pärt, but with a young composer's restlessness. The swan's song is speculatively re-created with otherworldly vocal ornaments. The piece also contains counterpoint that echoes 16th-century madrigals as well as a modern sense of theatrical timing that keeps your ears on edge until the last note."

Selected works

Opera
 The Righteous, world premiere at Santa Fe Opera, Libretto by Tracy K. Smith, 2024
 Castor and Patience, world premiere at Cincinnati Opera, Libretto by Tracy K. Smith, 2022
 Jason and the Argonauts, world premiere at Lyric Opera of Chicago, Libretto by Kathryn Walat, 2016
 Fellow Travelers, world premiere at Cincinnati Opera, Libretto by Greg Pierce, 2016
 O Columbia, commissioned by Houston Grand Opera, Libretto by Royce Vavrek, 2015
 Paul's Case, world premiere at UrbanArias, Libretto by Kathryn Walat, 2013
 Wolf-in-Skins, work-in-progress with choreographer and librettist Christopher Williams
 The Bricklayer, commissioned by Houston Grand Opera, Libretto by Farnoosh Moshiri, 2012

Orchestra

 Love Story, written for countertenor Anthony Roth Costanzo and commissioned by New York Philharmonic, 2021
 Concerto for Two Trumpets and Strings, written for trumpeter Brandon Ridenour and commissioned by the BMI Foundation/Carlos Surinach Fund and Concert Artist Guild, 2019
 A New Sanctus, Benedictus, and Agnus Dei for the Mozart Requiem, commissioned by Seraphic Fire and the Firebird Chamber Orchestra, 2013

Film score

 Macbeth, directed by Kit Monkman, 2018

Large chamber ensemble
 The Tower and the Garden, for choir and string quartet, commissioned by The Crossing (choral ensemble), 2018
 Virginiana, on texts by Robert Bolling, commissioned by The Damask Ensemble and New Vintage Baroque, 2015
 Requiem, commissioned by Christopher Williams Dances and released by New Amsterdam Records, 2010

Chamber ensemble
 String Quartet No. 2, world premiere by Chatter at SITE Santa Fe, 2022
 The Census at Bethlehem, for cello and harpsichord, world premiere by Chatter at SITE Santa Fe, 2022
 Our Lady, written for Ryland Angel and The Sebastian Chamber Players, 2011
 Buttonwood, for string quartet, commissioned for performance by the JACK Quartet in 2010

Solo piano
 Seven Days, written for pianist Pedja Muzijevic, world premiere by 92nd Street Y, 2021
 Toccata (Troika), commissioned for the New York International Piano Competition by the Stecher and Horowitz Foundation, 2018 
 Toccata (Wild Horses), commissioned by Marika Bournaki, 2012

Voice and piano
 Walden, on texts by Henry David Thoreau, a song cycle commissioned for baritone Brian Mulligan by Vocal Arts DC, 2018 
 Aquehonga, for mezzo-soprano and piano, commissioned by Five Boroughs Music Festival, 2017

References

External links

American male classical composers
21st-century classical composers
Living people
American classical composers
21st-century American composers
Eastman School of Music alumni
Yale University alumni
Princeton University alumni
Musicians from New York City
American opera composers
Male opera composers
Year of birth missing (living people)
Place of birth missing (living people)
Classical musicians from New York (state)
Classical musicians from Virginia
21st-century American male musicians